The government of Bidzina Ivanishvili was the government cabinet of Georgia, with Bidzina Ivanishvili its head as the country's Prime Minister. It was formed by the members of the Bidzina Ivanishvili–Georgian Dream coalition after the victory in the October 1, 2012 parliamentary election. The cabinet was confirmed by the Parliament of Georgia on October 25, 2012. It was succeeded, on November 20, 2013, by the government of Irakli Garibashvili, whom Ivanishvili named as his successor on his voluntary resignation from the government.

List of ministers and portfolios

See also

Government of Georgia
Cabinet of Zurab Zhvania

References

Government of Georgia (country)
2012 establishments in Georgia (country)
2013 disestablishments in Georgia (country)
Cabinets established in 2012
Cabinets disestablished in 2013